Chris Okasaki, Ph.D. is an associate professor of computer science at the United States Military Academy. He authored Purely Functional Data Structures (1998), based on a doctoral dissertation of the same name. He obtained a Ph.D. at Carnegie Mellon University in 1996 under advisers Peter Lee, Robert Harper, Daniel Sleator, and Robert Tarjan. Prior to his current academic appointment, he taught at Columbia University and the University of Glasgow.

Purely functional data structures 

Dr. Okasaki published his doctoral dissertation as a book in 1998. It approaches the topic of data structures from a functional programming perspective, describing techniques for designing immutable structures that incorporate persistence.

References 

Living people
Carnegie Mellon University alumni
Columbia University faculty
United States Military Academy faculty
Year of birth missing (living people)